Patrick Louis Biancone (born June 7, 1952 in Mont-de-Marsan, Landes, France) is a Thoroughbred racehorse trainer. He is currently based in the United States, but enjoyed success in both Europe and Hong Kong earlier in his career. He was the head trainer for the Daniel Wildenstein stable in France, where his horses won numerous important races including back-to-back victories (with All Along and Sagace) in the 1983 and 1984 Prix de l'Arc de Triomphe. After leaving his native France, for most of the 1990s Biancone trained in Hong Kong but in 1999 was suspended after two of his horses tested positive for banned medications.

Biancone trained Triptych, who won the 1987 Irish Champion Stakes and the 1988 Coronation Cup. However, his most famous horse is the '83 Arc winner All Along, a filly who also raced in North America and was voted both French and U.S. Horse of the Year honors and was inducted into the U.S. Racing Hall of Fame.

Among his efforts in the United States, Patrick Biancone  trained Lion Heart, who finished second in the 2004 Kentucky Derby. In 2005, he trained Angara to win the Beverly D stakes. The following year, Biancone's Gorella took the Beverly D.

On June 22, 2007, Biancone became the subject of an investigation by the Kentucky Horse Racing Authority (KHRA) and his Keeneland barns were raided by Kentucky stewards.

Cobra venom, which is barred by state regulation from racetrack grounds, was found in a crystalline form in a refrigerator in Biancone's barn during the raid. Snake venom is a neurotoxin that can be injected to deaden pain in a joint or nerve.

On September 17, 2007 Dr. Rodney Stewart, Biancone's veterinarian, was suspended for a total of five years by the KHRA for possessing cobra venom, two other Class A Drugs, and various other violations that resulted from the investigation after the June raid.

On October 4, 2007 Biancone was suspended for one year in by The KHRA, a penalty that on October 17, 2007 was shortened to a 6-month suspension with the caveat that Biancone could not apply for a trainer's license for another 6-months after the suspension ends. As a part of this settlement, Biancone agreed to remove his name as the "trainer of record" for his Breeders' Cup entries and to end his appeal of the suspension.  During the suspension his horses were moved to trainers that he has no business relationship, and he is banned from both the public and private areas of Kentucky race tracks (and through reciprocity all North American tracks).

The day after his settlement agreement with the KHRA, Biancone issued a press release that indicated that he was innocent.

References

1952 births
Living people
People from Mont-de-Marsan
French horse trainers
American horse trainers
Sportspeople from Landes (department)